The secretary of the interior and local government (Filipino: Kalihim ng Interyor at Pamahalaang Lokal) is the member of the Cabinet in charge of the Department of the Interior and Local Government.

The current secretary is Benjamin Abalos Jr., who assumed office on June 30, 2022.

List of secretaries of the interior and local government

References

External links
DILG website

 
Interior and Local Government
Philippines
Philippines